The list of ships owned and operated by Pickands Mather consists of barges and freighters operating on the Great Lakes in the United States and Canada. Vessels include those owned by the Marine Department of Pickands Mather & Company from the company's founding in 1883 until its sale to Diamond Shamrock Corporation in 1968; those owned by Diamond Shamrock Corporation until the sale of the subsidiary to Moore-McCormack Resources in 1973; those owned by Moore-McCormack Resources until the sale of the Pickands Mather subsidiary to Cleveland-Cliffs Inc. in 1986; and those owned by Cleveland-Cliffs until the spinoff of the Interlake Steamship Company subsidiary in 1987.

The list includes vessels owned personally by the owners of Pickands Mather and directly by Pickands Mather, as well as those owned by its subsidiaries. These include some vessels owned by the Interlake Steamship Company. This company was a subsidiary of Pickands Mather from the subsidiary's founding in 1894 until its spinning off as an independent corporation in 1987. It does not include vessels operated by Interlake Steamship since 1987. It also does not include vessels operated by other companies prior to their merger with Interlake, but does include those brought to the merger with Interlake and thereafter operated by Interlake.

Freighters

Barges

References
Notes

Citations

Bibliography

 
Pickands Mather